Kostelecký (anglicized as Kostelecky) is a Czech-language surname. Notable people with the name include:

 Alan Kostelecky, American theoretical physicist and professor
 David Kostelecký (born 1975), Czech sports shooter
 Jaroslav Kostelecký (born 1979), Czech racing driver

Czech-language surnames